Eliot Spizzirri (born 23 December 2001) is an American tennis player.

Spizzirri won the 2019 US Open – Boys' doubles title with fellow American Tyler Zink He currently plays college tennis at the University of Texas.

Junior Grand Slam finals

Doubles: 1 (1 title)

References

External links

2001 births
Living people
American male tennis players
Sportspeople from Stamford, Connecticut
Texas Longhorns men's tennis players
US Open (tennis) junior champions
Grand Slam (tennis) champions in boys' doubles
Tennis people from Connecticut